George Dickie may refer to:
 George Dickie (philosopher) (1926–2020), philosopher of art
 George Dickie (footballer) (1903–1960), Scottish footballer
 George Dickie (botanist) (1812–1882), Scottish botanist

See also
George Dickey (disambiguation)